Elena Makushkina is a retired Russian rower. She was world champion in the women's eight for three years in a row starting at the 1981 World Rowing Championships in Munich, Germany.

References 

Year of birth missing (living people)
Living people
Soviet female rowers
World Rowing Championships medalists for the Soviet Union
Place of birth missing (living people)